St Paul's Church was in the village of Marston, Cheshire, England.

The church was built in 1874 and designed by the Chester architect John Douglas.  It was a small church with lancet windows and a "miniature" spire at the west end with a spire.  The church has been demolished.

It is the only new church designed by John Douglas to have been demolished, other than St Matthew's Church, Saltney which was destroyed by fire in 2008.

See also

List of new churches by John Douglas

References

Bibliography

Former churches in Cheshire
Churches completed in 1874
19th-century churches in the United Kingdom
Gothic Revival church buildings in England
Gothic Revival architecture in Cheshire